The Old Town Hall is a municipal building in East Street in the Middlehaven area of Middlesbrough, North Yorkshire, England. The structure, which has been vacant since 1996, is a Grade II listed building. The adjacent clock tower is separately listed.

History
Following significant population growth, largely associated with the iron-smelting industry, civic leaders decided to commission a town hall. The site chosen was a prominent area in the newly-established market place. The new building was designed by William Lambie Moffatt in the Italianate style, built in red brick with stone dressings and was completed in 1846.

The design involved a symmetrical main frontage with five bays facing towards the River Tees. The central bay featured a doorway with a segmental surround and an entablature on the ground floor, and a round headed window with an architrave and a keystone on the first floor. The outer bays were fenestrated by mullioned windows on the ground floor and by round headed windows with architraves and keystones on the first floor. The end bays, which were slightly projected forward, were flanked by pilasters supporting a cornice and a parapet. A four-stage clock tower was erected behind the town hall; it featured blind round headed windows in the second and third stages and clock faces in the fourth stage with a trumpet-shaped roof above. Internally the principal room was the council chamber on the first floor.

The area went on to become a municipal borough with the town hall as its headquarters in 1853. However, in the early 1880s, civic leaders decided to procure a more substantial town hall on open land in a developing area to the south of the Middlesbrough branch of the Stockton and Darlington Railway.

The housing that had grown up around the market place in the 19th century was demolished in the slum clearances of the 1950s and a large suburban housing estate known as St Hilda's was established there in the 1970s. The old town hall continued to be used as a public library and as a community events venue for the St Hilda's estate until it was closed by Middlesbrough Council in 1996. Despite a local campaign to retain the estate, most of the 1970s housing was demolished as part of a regeneration project in the early years of the 21st century leaving the town hall derelict and isolated. After works began on the development of a new local digital media, digital technologies, and creative quarter in 2008, local councillors indicated their intention to secure the survival of the old town hall as part of the development of the zone.

References

Government buildings completed in 1846
City and town halls in North Yorkshire
Grade II listed buildings in North Yorkshire
Buildings and structures in Middlesbrough